The following is an alphabetical list of historic ships of the Sri Lanka Navy:

Commissioned vessels

A

HMCyS Aliya - “Empire” Class Seagoing Tug (ex-HMS ADEPT) commissioned on 1957 Nov 18 and was de-commissioned on 1963 Mar 31
SLNS Abeetha II (P316) - Shanghai II class Patrol Boat commissioned on 2000 Jun 11

B
SLNS Balawatha - Shanghai class fast gun boat commissioned in 1973

D
SLNS Dakshaya - Shanghai class fast gun boat commissioned in 1973
HMCyS DIYAKAWA - Short Patrol Boat decommissioned in 1970's

E
SLNS Edithara II (P317) - Shanghai II class Patrol Boat commissioned on 2000 Jun 11

G
SLNS Gajabahu - River class frigate (ex-HMCS Hallowell, ex-Israeli Misnak, ex-HMCyS Gajabahu) -former flagship commissioned on 1960 Apr 26 and decommissioned in 1978
SLNS Gajabahu (P626) - (ex-USCGC Sherman (WHEC-720)) Commissioned on 2019 Jun 6

H
HMCyS Hansaya - ‘BIRD’ CLASS Long patrol boat commissioned on 1955 Jan 4 and decommissioned in 1970's
 SLNS Hansaya - Fast Personnel Carrier

J
SLNS Jagatha (P315) - Shanghai Class fast gun boat commissioned in 1980 and decommissioned on 2020 Oct 12
SLNS Jayasena - Shanghai class fast gun boat
SLNS Jayesagra - Jayasagara Class patrol craft commissioned on 1983 Dec 9

K
SLNS Kandula - Landing Craft Medium commissioned in 1985 
HMCyS Kotiya - Seaward defence boat commissioned on 1955 May 8 and sank at her moorings during the cyclone “Emily” on 1964 Dec 24
HMCyS KORAWAKKA - Short Patrol Boat and decommissioned in 1970's
SLNS Korawakka - General duties Patrol craft commissioned in late 1970's

L
HMCyS Lihiniya - ‘BIRD’ CLASS Long patrol boat commissioned on 1955 Jan 4 and decommissioned in 1970's

M
HMCyS Mahasena - River class frigate (ex-HMCS  Violetta, Orkney and ex-Israeli ship Mivtach) commissioned on 1959 Sep 4 and de-commissioned on 1962 May 31
SLNS Mihikatha (P350) - (ex-ACV Corio Bay (ACV 50)) Bay Class patrol boat commissioned in 2014 July

N
SLNS Nandimitra (P701) - (ex-INS Komemiyut) Sa'ar 4 Class missile boat commissioned in 2000

P
HMCyS Parakrama - Algerine class minesweeper (ex-HMS Plucky (J295)) de-commissioned on 1963 Dec 13
SLNS Pabbatha - Landing Craft Medium commissioned in 1985
SLNS Parakramabahu (P 351) - Haiqing class Submarine Chaser -former flagship 
SLNS Parakramabahu (P625) - (ex-Type 053H2G frigate (542 Tongling)) Commissioned on 2019 Aug 22
SLNS Prathapa (P340 ) - Lushun Class Patrol Boat

R
SLNS Rakshaka - Shanghai Class fast gun boat commissioned on 1980
SLNS Ranakamee - Shanghai Class fast gun boat commissioned on 1973
SLNS Ranaviru - Shanghai Class fast gun boat
SLNS Ranasuru - Shanghai class fast gun boat and sank at its mooring on 1995 Apr 19
SLNS Rathnadeepa (P351) - (ex-ACV Hervey Bay (ACV 40)) Bay Class patrol boat commissioned in 2014 July
SLNS Ranajaya (P330) - Shanghai III Class Patrol Boat
SLNS Ranadeera (P331) - Shanghai III Class Patrol Boat
SLNS Ranawickrema (P332) - Shanghai III Class Patrol Boat
SLNS Ranarisi (P322 ) - Shanghai III Class Patrol Boat
SLNS Ranavijaya (L836) - Ranavijaya Class landing craft
SLNS Ranagaja (L839) - Ranavijaya Class landing craft

S
SLNS Sayurala (P623) - Saryu Class Advanced Offshore Patrol Vessel. Current flagship of the navy commissioned on 2017 Aug 2.

SLNS Sagarawardena - Jayasagara class patrol craft off-shore patrol craft commissioned in 1983 and sunk on 1994 Sep 20
SLNS Samudra Devi - Shershen class torpedo boat 451 ET 205 commissioned on 1975 Dec 31
SLNS Sayurala P623 - Vikram Class off-shore patrol craft
SLNS Sindurala (P624) - Saryu Class Advanced Offshore Patrol Vessel commissioned on 2018 Apr 19.

SLNS Sooraya - Shanghai class fast gun boat commissioned on 1972 Feb 22 and sank at its mooring on 1995 Apr 19
HMCyS Seruwa - Short Patrol Boat commissioned on 1955 Jul 15 and decommissioned in 1970's
SLNS Seruwa - General duties Patrol craft commissioned in late 1970's
SLNS Sayura (P620) - (ex-INS Sarayu) Sukanya class patrol vessel commissioned in 2000
SLNS Samadura (P621) - (ex-USCGC Courageous (WMEC-622)) medium endurance cutter commissioned in 2005
SLNS Sagara (P622) - (ex-ICGS Varaha (41)) Vikram Class offshore patrol vessel commissioned in 2006
SLNS Suranimala (P702) - (ex-INS Moledet) Sa'ar 4 Class missile boat commissioned in 2000
SLNS Shakthi (L880) - Type 074 landing ship

T
HMCyS TARAWA - Short Patrol Boat decommissioned in 1970's

U
SLNS Udara (P341) - Lushun Class Patrol Boat commissioned on 2000 Jun 11

W
SLNS Weeraya (formally HMCyS Weeraya) (P311) - Shanghai Class fast gun boat commissioned on 1972 Feb 22 and decommissioned on 2020 Oct 12
SLNS Wickrama II (P318) - Shanghai II Class commissioned on 2000 Jun 11
V
HMCyS Vijaya - Algerine class minesweeper (ex-HMS Flying Fish (J370)) -former flagship de-commissioned on 1963 Mar 31

Auxiliary vessels

 
 A 520
 A 521 -Diving support vessel
 A 530 - ABS M-10 LSC hovercraft used for logistic supply purposes
 A 543
 A 623
 Jetliner - Troopship leased from 2006 to 2012
 MV Pearl Cruise II - Troopship

See also
List of current Sri Lanka Navy ships

External links

 www.navy.lk
 www.somasiridevendra.navy.lk

Military history of Sri Lanka
Sri Lanka Navy
ships